George Hay-Drummond, 12th Earl of Kinnoull   (16 July 1827 – 30 January 1897), styled as Viscount Dupplin until 1866, was a Scottish peer and cricketer. His titles were Earl of Kinnoull, Viscount Dupplin and Lord Hay of Kinfauns in the Peerage of Scotland; and Baron Hay of Pedwardine in the Peerage of Great Britain.

Biography

He was the son of Thomas Robert Hay-Drummond, 11th Earl of Kinnoull, and Louisa Burton Rowley, daughter of Sir Charles Rowley, 1st Baronet.

He married Lady Emily Blanche Charlotte Somerset, daughter of Henry Somerset, 7th Duke of Beaufort, and Emily Frances (née Smith), on 20 July 1848. She, who was born 26 January 1828, died of bronchitis, 27 January 1895, at the Berkeley Hotel, Piccadilly, London, and was buried at Dupplin. He died on 30 January 1897, aged 69, at 'The Bungalow,  Torquay, Devon. He was buried on the afternoon of Saturday, 6 February 1897, within the little private family burying ground in the gardens of Dupplin Castle.

He served as Justice of the Peace and Deputy Lieutenant of Perthshire.

The Earl and Countess had nine children:

George Robert Hay, Viscount Dupplin (27 May 1849 – 10 March 1886), married Lady Agnes Duff, daughter of James Duff, 5th Earl Fife, and Lady Agnes Hay, daughter of William Hay, 18th Earl of Erroll. He died s.p.m. with one daughter:
Hon. Agnes Blanche Marie Hay
Lady Constance Blanche Louisa (15 August 1851 – 21 December 1931), married cricketer Walter Henry Hadow
Hon. Francis George Hay (29 May 1853 – 11 September 1884)
Archibald Hay, 13th Earl of Kinnoull (20 June 1855 – 7 February 1916)
Lady Celia Evangeline Constance (9 June 1857 – 18 May 1868)
Capt. Hon. Alistair George Hay (18 April 1861 – 15 April 1929), married Hon. Camilla Greville, daughter of Algernon Greville, 2nd Baron Greville 
Hon. Claude George Drummond Hay (24 June 1862 – 24 October 1920)
Lady Muriel Henrietta Constance (14 August  1863 – 2 January 1927), married Count Alexander zu Münster 
Lady Magdalen Constance Mary (born 15 December 1866)

Ancestors

References

External links
The Greatest Cricket Teams that Never Existed by Allen Maslen
12th Earl of Kinnoull at ESPNcricinfo.com

1827 births
1897 deaths
12
English cricketers
Marylebone Cricket Club cricketers
Presidents of the Marylebone Cricket Club
Deputy Lieutenants of Perthshire